WCIT-FM (106.3 MHz) is a radio station broadcasting Family Life Network's contemporary Christian music format. Licensed to Oneida, New York, United States, the station serves central New York with an emphasis on Madison and Oneida counties. The former WMCR-FM flipped from classic hits to Family Life Network's contemporary Christian music format in March 2016, with a call sign change on April 6, 2016, to WCIT-FM.

References

External links

Radio stations established in 1972
1972 establishments in New York (state)
CIT-FM